Noah Baerman (born March 6, 1975) is an American jazz pianist and educator best known in Connecticut's jazz circles.

Early life and education 
Baerman was born in New Haven, Connecticut. He earned a Bachelor of Music and Master of Music in jazz studies from Rutgers University. During college, Baerman was mentored by Kenny Barron.

Career 
Baerman has released nine studio albums and collaborated with prominent jazz musicians, including Wayne Escoffery, Nadje Noordhuis, Linda May Han Oh, Ike Sturm, Jimmy Greene, Robin Eubanks, Warren Smith, and others. He has appeared on Piano Jazz. Although primarily a jazz musician, Baerman has done occasional work in gospel, soul music, R&B, and pop music.

Personal life 
Baerman has Ehlers–Danlos syndromes (EDS). The condition nearly led him to quit music at 28, though he decided against it. Baerman has since become an advocate for others diagnosed with EDS.

References

External links 
Noah Baerman Jazz site

American jazz pianists
American male pianists
Wesleyan University faculty
People with Ehlers–Danlos syndrome
Jazz musicians from Connecticut
American male jazz musicians

People from Middletown, Connecticut
People from New Haven, Connecticut
Musicians from New Haven, Connecticut
Rutgers University alumni